Aleksandr Musafovic Makhmutov (born 10 March 1966) is a Russian boxer. He competed in the men's light flyweight event at the 1988 Summer Olympics.

Career
Makhmutov continued boxing and briefly held the EBU flyweight champion between 1999 and 2000. He returned to the championship in late 2000 and has defended it five times before losing when challenging for the WBO flyweight world champion against a French Brahim Asloum in 2004. He retired after this defeat. Before that, in 2003 he had challenged for the WBO flyweight world champion once against Omar Narváez of Argentina, losing by TKO.

References

External links
 

1966 births
Living people
Russian male boxers
Olympic boxers of the Soviet Union
Boxers at the 1988 Summer Olympics
People from Elektrostal
Light-flyweight boxers
Flyweight boxers
Super-flyweight boxers
Sportspeople from Moscow Oblast